Erik Bodom (September 28, 1829 – 16 April 1879) was a Norwegian landscape painter.

Biography
Erik Bodom was born in Vestby in Akershus, Norway. He was a pupil at the Oslo Cathedral School, but shortly left school to educate himself as a painter. He attended the Royal Drawing School, studying under Johannes Flintoe  during 1847. He was a student of Hans Gude during 1848. In 1850, he traveled to Düsseldorf, where he made rapid progress. In 1852, he sold a landscape painting Aus dem Bondhusthal  (From the Bondhusdalen),  to Bridgewater Gallery in London. The following year, he became an honorary member of the Royal Academy in Amsterdam.

Bodom developed a distinctly romanticized form of landscape painting. He painted in a style similar to that associated with August Cappelen, who was noted for his melancholic and romantic landscape paintings. Bodom often featured scenes from the coniferous forests of Eastern Norway. The composition of such images frequently featured landscapes of forested hills and quiet ponds, often with a bewitching atmosphere using strong contrasts between light and dark.

In 1862, Bodom established a permanent residence in Germany, That same year he visited Norway for the last time. He died in Düsseldorf. The National Museum of Art, Architecture and Design is the owner of several pieces of his art including Fra Nordmarken (1857), Havneparti (1865), and Kystparti med bauta og vrak (1878).

Gallery

Notes
Sources differ regarding the date of his death. Monroe (1908) and Hannover (1922), among others, give 1879, but Muther (1896) gives 1873 and the Meyers Konversations-Lexikon 4th ed. (1890) gives April 18, 1880.

References

Other sources

External links
 

1829 births
1879 deaths
Norwegian landscape painters
Norwegian expatriates in Germany
19th-century Norwegian painters
Norwegian male painters
People from Vestby
19th-century Norwegian male artists
Düsseldorf school of painting